The 2015 Tour de Luxembourg was the 75th edition of the Tour de Luxembourg cycle stage race. It was part of the 2015 UCI Europe Tour as a 2.HC event, and was won by Germany's Linus Gerdemann, riding for the  team.

Schedule
The race was held over five stages, including a prologue on the opening day.

Teams
15 teams were selected to take place in the 2015 Tour de Luxembourg. Two of these were UCI WorldTeams, ten were UCI Professional Continental teams and three were UCI Continental teams.

Stages

Prologue
3 June 2015 – Luxembourg City, individual time trial (ITT)

Stage 1
4 June 2015 – Luxembourg City to Clemency,

Stage 2
5 June 2015 – Ell to Walferdange,

Stage 3
6 June 2015 – Eschweiler to Diekirch,

Stage 4
7 June 2015 – Mersch to Luxembourg City,

Classification leadership

Final standings

General classification

Young rider classification

Points classification

Mountains classification

Teams classification

References

External links

Tour de Luxembourg
Tour de Luxembourg
Tour de Luxembourg